Sosban Fach (Welsh for "little saucepan") is a traditional Welsh folk song. It is one of the best-known and most often sung songs in the Welsh language.

The song is based on a verse written by Mynyddog in 1873 as part of his song Rheolau yr Aelwyd ("Rules of the home") — see below. Talog Williams, an accountant from Dowlais, created the song we have today by altering Mynyddog's verse and adding four new verses. The song catalogues the troubles of a harassed housewife.

The song is associated with the rugby union club Llanelli RFC and, more recently, the Scarlets regional rugby side. The association derives from Llanelli's tin plating industry, which used to tin-plate steel saucepans and other kitchen utensils as a cheap supply to the British public. During the final years of Stradey Park, the former ground of Llanelli RFC and the Scarlets, the goalposts were adorned with Scarlet saucepans as a tribute to the town's history; the utensils have been transferred to the clubs' new ground, Parc y Scarlets. The Scarlets' official magazine is titled Sosban.

Bryn Terfel recorded the song on his 2000 album We'll Keep a Welcome.

Lyrics

Variations
This song has been adopted by the fans of the rugby team, the Llanelli Scarlets. Many English variations can be heard in the stands during rugby matches.

After Llanelli beat a strong New Zealand side on 31 October 1972, a new English chorus could be heard:

Who beat the All Blacks,
Who beat the All Blacks,
Who beat the All Blacks
Good old Sosban fach.

Honouring the Llanelli RFC teams which beat the touring Australian national teams in 1908 and 1992, a further English chorus variation has been sung alongside the All Blacks verse:

 Who beat the Walla-Wallabies?
 Who beat the Walla-Wallabies?
 Who beat the Walla-Wallabies?
 Good old Sosban Fach

Other variations include the following.

Who beat the Leicester Tigers?
Who beat the Leicester Tigers?
Good old Dafydd James

Dafydd James refers to a player who scored the winning points in a Heineken Cup match.

A verse was "uncovered" in Patagonia that is sung by descendants of Welsh settlers and follows the second original verse:

Fe gladdwyd y gath mewn lle doniol:
Mewn bocs lle'r oedd Nain yn cadw'r startsh,
A dodwyd ei chorff mewn beddrod,
A'r band yn chwarae y death-march

("The cat was buried in a funny place / In a box where Granny kept starch / Her body was placed in a grave / And the band is playing the death march.")

Original verse by Mynyddog

Other media

Author Diana Wynne Jones refers to the song several times as 'Calcifer's silly saucepan song' in her book Howl's Moving Castle.

The Welsh rock band Man has a recording of the song on the live album Back Into the Future, 1973.  It is sung by the Gwalia Male Choir.

See also
 Sospan Dau, a ship named for the song

References

External links

Live performance here :
https://m.youtube.com/watch?v=nUn5Q_bx40g

Welsh folk songs
Llanelli
Scarlets
Llanelli RFC